Extrasolar PlanetsEncyclopaediadata

HD 176051 is a spectroscopic binary star system approximately 49 light years away from Earth in the constellation Lyra. The pair orbit with a period of 22,423 days (61.4 years) and an eccentricity of 0.25. Compared to the Sun, they have a somewhat lower proportion of elements more massive than helium. Their individual masses are estimated at 1.07 and 0.71 solar masses.

Planetary system 

A planet orbiting one of the stars was discovered through astrometric observations. However, it is not known which stellar component the planet is orbiting around.

The planet parameters are given here for the  component B.
But, if instead the planet is orbiting the  component A, its mass is 2.26  with a semimajor axis of 2.02 AU.

See also 
 List of star systems within 45–50 light-years
 Alpha Centauri
 Gamma Cephei

References

External links 
HD 176051 b on The Extrasolar Planets Encyclopaedia
Candidate substellar companions of binary systems

Lyra (constellation)
G-type main-sequence stars
K-type main-sequence stars
HD, 176051
Spectroscopic binaries
176051
093017
7162
0738
Planetary systems with one confirmed planet